Merinda Dingjan (born 15 January 1991) is an Australian swimmer who won a bronze medal in the  medley at the 2011 World Aquatics Championships.

She was born in Arnhem, Netherlands, but later moved to Canberra.

References

External links
 

1991 births
Living people
Australian female freestyle swimmers
Sportspeople from Arnhem
World Aquatics Championships medalists in swimming
Dutch emigrants to Australia
Sportspeople from Canberra